Wisk'achani (Aymara wisk'acha a rodent,-ni a suffix to indicate ownership, "the one with the viscacha", hispanicized spelling Viscachani) is a mountain in the Bolivian Andes which reaches a height of approximately . It is located in the La Paz Department, Loayza Province, Luribay Municipality.

References 

Mountains of La Paz Department (Bolivia)